Róbson Michael Signorini (born 10 November 1987), commonly known as Robinho, is a Brazilian footballer who plays as a midfielder for Avaí.

Career
Robson was formed in the basic categories of International and further excel in Mogi Mirim in 2008, where he was the top scorer of the second division team in São Paulo, Robson hit three-year contract with Santos. It also is nicknamed Robinho but prefers to be called Robson.

In December 2009, agreed with your Avai release was a condition of hiring Marquinhos by Santos.

After a one-year loan to Avaí, Robson returned to Santos in January 2011.

On 4 February 2011, Robson signed a pre-contract with Avaí, and the contract runs out in May, when the player's contract with Santos end.

He left Santos to play as a regular starter for Avaí on 3 May 2011.

On 12 January 2015, Robinho was signed by Palmeiras.

Career statistics

Honours

Club
Avaí
Campeonato Catarinense: 2010, 2012

Coritiba
Campeonato Paranaense: 2013

Palmeiras
Copa do Brasil: 2015

Individual
Campeonato Paulista Team of the year: 2015

References

External links

1987 births
Living people
Brazilian footballers
Association football midfielders
Campeonato Brasileiro Série A players
Campeonato Brasileiro Série B players
Mogi Mirim Esporte Clube players
Santos FC players
Avaí FC players
Coritiba Foot Ball Club players
Sociedade Esportiva Palmeiras players
Cruzeiro Esporte Clube players
Grêmio Foot-Ball Porto Alegrense players
Sportspeople from Paraná (state)